Bom the Flyer (Swedish: Flyg-Bom) is a 1952 Swedish comedy film directed by Lars-Eric Kjellgren and starring Nils Poppe, Elisaveta, Yvonne Lombard and Gerd Andersson. It was shot at the Råsunda in Stockholm. The film's sets were designed by the art director Nils Svenwall. It was part of a series of films featuring Poppe as Fabian Bom.

Cast
 Nils Poppe as Fabian Bom / Bom senior
 Elisaveta as 	Lisa Larsson Röök
 Yvonne Lombard as 	Saga Saxholm
 Gerd Andersson as 	Anita Berg
 Gunnar Björnstrand as 	Sergeant Niklas Slevbrink
 John Botvid as 	Jonte Larsson Röök
 Arne Källerud as Pluggen, flygbassoldat
 Hjördis Petterson as Fru Wikman
 Inga Landgré as 	Matilda
 Else Fisher as 	Amanda
 Margit Andelius as 	Fröken Psilander
 Sven Magnusson as 	Stickan, flygbassoldat
 Nils Eklund as 	Molnet, flygbassoldat
 Arne Lindblad as 	Jean-Jacques Pampouche
 Ragnar Klange as 	Grankvist, hyresvärd
 Kenneth Pedersen as 	Balettstudent
 Per Appelberg as 	Flygbassoldat 
 Josua Bengtson as 	Ölkompis 
 Sven Berghall as 	Flygbassoldat 
 Lily Berglund as 	Sångare 
 Hugo Bolander as Fallskärmsprästen 
 Kerstin 'Kicki' Bratt as 	Modell 
 Birgitta Böhm as 	Balettstudent 
 Tom Dan-Bergman as Pilot 
 Sven Ericsson as 	Lång man 
 Karl-Axel Forssberg as 	Postkontorstjänsteman
 Nils Hallberg as 	Pilot 
 Gunnar Hammar as 	Flygbassoldat 
 Gustav Hedberg as Major 
 Ulf Johansson as 	Kapten 
 Ludde Juberg as 	Präst 
 Inger-Marianne Klagström as 	Kyssande flicka 
 Olof Krook as 	Ölkompis 
 Fredrik Larsson as Balettstudent 
 Uno Larsson as 	Ölkompis 
 Rune Lindkvist as 	Kyssande man 
 Sten Lonnert as Flygbassoldat 
 Max Lundek as Flygbassoldat
 Wilma Malmlöf as 	Balettstudent 
 Lena Malmsjö as 	Balettstudent 
 Hans Nilsson as Flygbassoldat 
 Ulla Norgren as Flicka med puderdosa 
 Birgit Norlindh as 	Balettstudent 
 Anita Rosén as	Modell 
 Birger Sahlberg as 	Ölkompis 
 Margit Sjödin as 	Modell 
 Helge Sjökvist as 	Ölkompis 
 Olle Teimert as 	Flygbassoldat 
 Berit Thul as 	Modell 
 Bengt Thörnhammar as 	Flygbassoldat 
 Alice Timander as 	Underklädesmodell 
 Birger Åsander as Korpral Svensson

References

Bibliography 
 Qvist, Per Olov & von Bagh, Peter. Guide to the Cinema of Sweden and Finland. Greenwood Publishing Group, 2000.

External links 
 

1952 films
Swedish comedy films
1952 comedy films
1950s Swedish-language films
Films directed by Lars-Eric Kjellgren
Swedish sequel films
1950s Swedish films

sv:Flyg-Bom